Cyclopteryx is a genus of moths of the family Erebidae. The genus was erected by Achille Guenée in 1854.

Species
Cyclopteryx laniata Hampson, 1924
Cyclopteryx observalis Guenée, 1854

References

Calpinae